Ultimate Manilow is a compilation of the greatest hits of Barry Manilow. Nearly every top 20 hit is included in this collection. This compilation is best known for setting the stage for a comeback for Manilow, as it debuted at No. 3 on the charts. While on a six-week tour to promote his latest album Here at the Mayflower, Manilow immediately extended it to a six-month tour. At the time Ultimate Manilow was released, no other compilations of Manilow's music were in print.

Ultimate Manilow, with a slightly different track listing (but with the same number of tracks), was also issued in the United Kingdom in 2004, charting first in March of that year.

Track listing

Track information and credits for the US version were verified from the album's liner notes.
Additional track information and credits for the UK, Australian and Japan versions were adapted from Discogs,  AllMusic. and Manilow's official website.

Charts

Weekly charts

Year-end charts

Certifications

References

External links
Barry Manilow Official Site
Arista Records Official Site

2002 greatest hits albums
Barry Manilow compilation albums
Arista Records compilation albums